Kamara Nadine Bacchus (born 11 January 1986) is a British actress and radio personality.

Biography
Her debut acting role was in the ITV police drama The Bill she then went on to play roles in the CBBC sitcom Kerching! followed by roles in West 10 LDN, the BBC comedy Beautiful People, and then on to a role in Doctor Who with the Eleventh Doctor.

Kamara is a graduate of the BRIT School. She was invited back in 2009 to give a talk as part of a career day alongside other former students.

Kamara used to present Radio shows on the digital station; colourful Radio and on her Royal Holloway University of London Radio Station 1287AM Insanity (now Insanity Radio 103.2FM).

Kamara was ranked second in a Miss Jamaica Beauty Pageant in 2004.

Whilst studying Kamara appeared in theatre productions of Ursula, American Dream, Macbeth and Our Country's Good.

Filmography

References

Black British actresses
Living people
1986 births
Actresses from London
English television actresses
People educated at the BRIT School
21st-century English actresses
English people of Kenyan descent
English people of Jamaican descent